= Giuseppe Macchiarella =

Giuseppe Macchiarella from the Politecnico di Milano, Milano, Italy was named Fellow of the Institute of Electrical and Electronics Engineers (IEEE) in 2015 for contributions to the synthesis of microwave filters and multiplexers.
